Kamenjane is a village in the municipality of Bogovinje, North Macedonia. It is located about seven kilometres west of Tetovo. The name (Kamenyane - English spelling) means stoneville in English. Kamenjane used to be the seat of a separate municipality that bore its name before it was merged with that of Bogovinje in 2004.

Demographics
As of the 2021 census, Kamenjane had 3,654 residents with the following ethnic composition:
Albanians 3,385
Persons for whom data are taken from administrative sources 265
Bosniaks 3
Macedonians 2
Others 1

According to the 2002 census, the village had a total of 4,834 inhabitants. Ethnic groups in the village include:

Albanians 4,825
Bosniaks 1
Others 8

Sports
The local football club, KF Kamjani, plays in the Macedonian Third League (West Division).

References

External links

Villages in Bogovinje Municipality
Albanian communities in North Macedonia